The Sale Swing Bridge is located on the South Gippsland Highway Longford, 5 km south of the city of Sale, Victoria, Australia and spans the Latrobe River at its junction with the Thomson River.

Designed by John Grainger and built in 1883 by the Victorian government, it was the first movable bridge built in Victoria.  Its wrought-iron structure, 45 metres long, pivots on cylindrical steel columns.  At its peak, the bridge was opened up to 20 times a day, allowing the movement of steamers between Sale and Melbourne.

The bridge underwent major restoration works towards the end of 2003, which were completed by the start of 2006. Since the restoration about 2,500 tourists have visited the bridge each year.

The Sale Swing Bridge was used as a set in 2007 for the filming of the 2008 film The Tender Hook, starring Hugo Weaving and Rose Byrne.

In April 2017 vandals lodged a block of wood in the gear mechanism, causing an axle to bend and the bottom roller beam to crack.  The bridge was re-opened in July 2017 after a $160,000 repair.

Engineering heritage award 
The bridge is listed as an Engineering Heritage National Landmark by Engineers Australia as part of its Engineering Heritage Recognition Program.

References

External links
 Video of the bridge in action
 Walkabout – Sale
 Exhibitions: A Golden Heritage On-line

Swing bridges in Australia
Bridges completed in 1883
Road bridges in Victoria (Australia)
Steel bridges in Australia
1883 establishments in Australia
Sale, Victoria
Recipients of Engineers Australia engineering heritage markers
Victorian Heritage Register
Shire of Wellington